Leptofreya ambigua is a species of jumping spider. The species was first described by Carl Ludwig Koch in 1846.

Range 
Leptofreya ambigua has been observed from the Amazon basin up to the southern part of the United States.

References

Salticidae
Spiders of South America
Spiders of Central America
Spiders of North America